Rayven Justice (born August 13, 1991) is an American 
rapper, singer, and actor from Oakland, California. He started his career as part of the rap and songwriter duo Justice Brothers with his brother Raymen. Rayven Justice began pursuing a full-time solo career in 2010, and his vocals typically blend R&B with "hip hop beats and plenty of bass." His collaborative album Both Sides of the Tracks was released in 2012, and he has also collaborated with artists such as French Montana, Dubb, Iamsu!, TeeFlii, Problem, Waka Flocka Flame, Pleasure P, and Migos. After releasing a number of singles, Rayven Justice released his I Have a Dream EP and album in 2014. Currently based in Oakland, he tours regularly.

Early life
Rayven Justice was born on August 13, 1991 in Oakland, California. Raised in East Oakland, in his youth he started making music with his younger brother, singing and rapping under his legal name Rayven Justice. His brother's name Raymen Justice, and together they formed the hip hop and R&B musical duo Justice Brothers. After his brother was shot and killed in 2010, Rayven Justice decided to commit himself full-time to music in his brother's memory.

Music career

2010–12: First releases
In 2010, he collaborated on the track "Throw the Cash," which proved to be Rayven Justice's first significant breakthrough. The single was later included on his August 2011 mixtape Something About Rayven. In 2012, he soon after released the album Both Sides of the Tracks. Rayven Justice released several singles that summer as well. In 2013, he partnered with Rita Lee, CEO of Nuface Entertainment, to form Rayven Justice Music Group, and Signed a non-exclusive distribution deal with Empire Distribution.Although a partnership with California based label Urban Life Distribution with aegis of Sony RED was planned , Justice chose EMPIRE Distribution .

2013: "Slide Thru" and collaborations

In late 2013 he released his single "Slide Thru," which featured Migos. It was published through Empire Distribution in San Francisco, and received regular airplay on the Bay Area radio station KMEL. Wrote Complex.com about the song in 2014, "it shows how very slight variations on an existing formula can create radically different effects on the listener, the cartoonish 'I'm Different' pianos mutating into enigmatic atmosphere." A remix of "Slide Thru" by Migos was later released in March 2014.

In January 2014, he release the mixtape I have a dream was released by January 20, 2014

August 2014: I Have a Dream EP and album
He has toured in support of his music, opening KMEL's annual Summer Jam concert held at the Oracle Arena in Oakland. According to Rayven Justice, the Oracle Arena performance held personal significance, as he and his younger brother had previously promised one another never to attend Summer Jam unless they were performing at the event. He was living in the Bay Area as of early 2014, also spending time in Los Angeles to collaborate with rappers and producers such as TeeFlii., and in September he toured throughout much of the United States with Compton rapper Problem .

On August 19, 2014, he released the EP I Have a Dream, with tracks such as "Slide Thru," "I See You" featuring Kool John, and "Hit or Nah." The album was released on his own record label, with the singles distributed through Empire Distribution.  He released a second remix of his earlier track "Slide Thru" in October 2014, with a feature by Atlanta rapper Waka Flocka Flame. A music video for their collaboration was released in early November, as was an album-length version of I Have a Dream Deluxe. Rayven Justice is one of several Bay Area artists selected to perform at the first EMPIRE Unplugged live recording session on December 11, 2014, which also included other soul and R&B artists such as Chinx Uncle Murda Joe Moses Eric Bellinger, Jonn Hart, and Lyrica Anderson.

In early 2015, he released a single with aspiring rapper Ankit Oswal "AO" under the label Team3MG. This topped multiple charts on youtube, and desi-hiphop. He is currently working with AO on a second single expected to be released in early 2017.

July 17, 2015 Rayven Justice  released  The Cassette Playlist  Mixtape  hosted  by Dj Carisma.

Style and equipment
Rayven Justice's songs typically blend R&B stylings and vocals with "a hip hop beat and plenty of bass."

Discography

Albums

Extended plays

Singles

Guest appearances

References

External links
RayvenJustice510.com

Living people
1991 births
People from Oakland, California
American rhythm and blues singer-songwriters
Singer-songwriters from California
21st-century American singers